Elachista ermolenkoi is a moth in the family Elachistidae. It was described by Sinev and Sruoga in 1995. It is found in south-eastern Siberia.

References

Moths described in 1995
ermolenkoi
Moths of Asia